Wan Saifulruddin bin Wan Jan (born 20 June 1975), better known as Wan Saiful Wan Jan, is a Malaysian politician who has served as the Member of Parliament (MP) for Tasek Gelugor since November 2022. He is a member of the Malaysian United Indigenous Party (BERSATU), a component party of the opposition Perikatan Nasional (PN) coalition. Wan Saiful joined BERSATU in February 2018, which at the time was a component party of the opposition Pakatan Harapan (PH) coalition. When PH formed the government after the 2018 Malaysian general election, Wan Saiful took the post of Special Advisor to the Minister of Education Maszlee Malik from May to November 2018. Wan Saiful served as the Strategy and Policy Bureau Deputy Chairman of BERSATU from March 2018 to August 2020 and its Information Chief from August 2020 to his resignation in February 2023. He also served as Chairman of the Perbadanan Tabung Pendidikan Tinggi Nasional (PTPTN) from June 2018 after the resignation of Shamsul Anuar Nasarah following collapse of the Barisan Nasional (BN) administration in May 2018 thanks to its defeat in the 2018 general election to June 2022.

Corporate career
Before joining politics, Wan Saiful was Chief Executive Officer (CEO) of the Institute for Democracy and Economic Affairs (IDEAS) co-founded by YAM Tunku Zain Al-'Abidin ibni Tuanku Muhriz, the son of the Yang di-Pertuan Besar of Negeri Sembilan, Tuanku Muhriz ibni Almarhum Tuanku Munawir.

Political career 
Wan Saiful ran for election in the 2018 Malaysian general election, contesting the Pendang parliamentary seat for the Pakatan Harapan coalition (appearing on the ballot under the People's Justice Party symbol). Wan Saiful's opponents were Awang Hashim of the Idea of Peace (PAS), Othman Abdul of the Barisan Nasional (UMNO) and Abdul Malik. Manaf, an Independent candidate. In the four-cornered contest, Wan Saiful only got 14,901 votes, the third highest after Awang Hashim and Othman Abdul.

Wan Saiful then won the Tasek Gelugor parliamentary seat in the 2022 Malaysian general election, winning 46% of the vote in a five-cornered fight.

Controversies
On 21 February 2023, Wan Saiful was charged with corruption related to the Jana Wibawa programme.The next day, he resigned as the BERSATU Information Chief and it was accepted by BERSATU President Muhyiddin Yassin. He appealed to the public not to link him with the "court cluster" (referring to Deputy Prime Minister Ahmad Zahid Hamidi and others who were facing court charges) in the government led by Prime Minister Anwar Ibrahim.

Election results

Honours 
  :
  Companion of the Order of Loyalty to Tuanku Muhriz (DTM) (2015)
  :
  Commander of the Order of the Territorial Crown (PMW) – Datuk (2021)

References 

People from Kedah
1975 births
Living people
Malaysian United Indigenous Party politicians